La Condamine is a small lunar impact crater that is located on the southern edge of the Mare Frigoris, in the northern part of the Moon. It lies to the northeast of the mountain-rimmed Sinus Iridum formation in the northwest part of the Mare Imbrium.

The crater rim is low and rounded, with the edge worn and eroded along the northeast side. The outer wall is somewhat polygonal, particularly in the southwestern half. The interior is fairly flat with no central peak, but there is a low curved, double rille in the western half that reaches toward the northern rim.

Satellite craters
By convention these features are identified on lunar maps by placing the letter on the side of the crater midpoint that is closest to La Condamine.

References

 
 
 
 
 
 
 
 
 
 
 
 

Impact craters on the Moon